The grey-crested finch (Lophospingus griseocristatus) is a species of bird in the tanager family Thraupidae. It is found in Bolivia and northwestern Argentina where its natural habitats are subtropical or tropical high-altitude shrubland and heavily degraded former forest. The bird was first described in 1837 by the French ornithologist Frédéric de Lafresnaye and the French zoologist Alcide d'Orbigny after the latter had collected it on an expedition he undertook for the Paris Museum to South America between 1826 and 1833.

Description
The grey-crested finch has a distinctive erect, spiky grey crest. Other parts of the bird are grey also, with the underparts being paler than the upper parts, and the belly being whitish. The wings and tail are deeper grey, except for the outer corners of the tail which are white and particularly noticeable in flight. The beak is yellow, pink and grey.

Distribution and habitat
The grey-crested finch is native to South America. It typically occurs in arid habitats, in dry scrubland with tall cacti, dry valleys in the mountains, and on the fringes of agricultural land. It is common in Bolivia but less so in Argentina.

Ecology
The grey-crested finch is generally seen in small groups foraging on the ground for seeds and small invertebrates. Little is known of its breeding habits but in Bolivia, juveniles have been seen in Cochabamba Department in December and June and in Santa Cruz Department in April.

Status
The grey-crested finch has a wide range and is a common species. Although the population size has not been estimated, its trend seems to be stable, and the International Union for Conservation of Nature has assessed the bird's conservation status as being of "least concern".

References

External links
 Xeno-canto: audio recordings of the grey-crested finch

grey-crested finch
Birds of the Bolivian Andes
grey-crested finch
Taxonomy articles created by Polbot